Ascandra biscayae is a species of calcareous sponge from the Bay of Biscay.

Animals described in 1987
biscayae
Taxa named by Nicole Boury-Esnault